, also known as the Venus Climate Orbiter (VCO) and Planet-C, is a Japan Aerospace Exploration Agency (JAXA) space probe tasked with studying the atmosphere of Venus. It was launched aboard an H-IIA 202 rocket on 20 May 2010, but failed to enter orbit around Venus on 6 December 2010. After the craft  orbited the Sun for five years, engineers successfully placed it into an alternative Venusian elliptic orbit on 7 December 2015 by firing its attitude control thrusters for 20 minutes and made it the first Japanese satellite orbiting Venus.

By using five different cameras working at several wavelengths, Akatsuki is studying the stratification of the atmosphere, atmospheric dynamics, and cloud physics. Astronomers working on the mission reported detecting a possible gravity wave (not to be confused with gravitational waves) in Venus' atmosphere in December 2015.

Mission
Akatsuki is Japan's first planetary exploration mission since the failed Mars orbiter Nozomi probe which was launched in 1998. This larger orbit takes 10 days to complete instead of the originally planned 30 hours. The budget for this mission is ¥14.6 billion for the satellite and ¥9.8 billion (US$116 million) for the launch.

Observations include cloud and surface imaging from an orbit around the planet with cameras operating in the infrared, visible and UV wavelengths to investigate the complex Venusian meteorology and elucidate the processes behind the mysterious atmospheric super-rotation. Other experiments are designed to confirm the presence of lightning and to determine whether volcanism occurs currently on Venus.

Spacecraft design
The solar arrays provide over 700 W of power while in Venus orbit.

It is the first spacecraft to use a ceramic (silicon nitride) retrofire thruster.

The high-gain antenna is flat to prevent heat from building up in it. Akatsuki also has a pair of medium-gain horn antennas mounted on turntables and two low-gain antennas for command uplink. The medium-gain horn antennas are used for housekeeping data downlink when the high-gain antenna is not facing Earth.

Instruments
The scientific payload consists of six instruments. The five imaging cameras are exploring Venus in wavelengths from ultraviolet to the mid-infrared:
the Lightning and Airglow Camera (LAC) is looking for lightning in the visible spectrum (552-777 nm)
the ultraviolet imager (UVI) is studying the distribution of specific atmospheric gases such as sulfur dioxide and the famous unknown absorber at ultraviolet wavelengths (283–365 nm)
the longwave infrared camera (LIR) is studying the structure of high-altitude clouds at a wavelength where they emit heat (10 μm) 
the infrared 1 μm camera (IR1) is imaging on the night side heat radiation (0.90–1.01 μm) emitted from Venus's surface and help researchers to spot active volcanoes, if they exist. While on the day side, it sensed the solar near-infrared radiation (0.90 μm) reflected by the middle clouds. Unavailable for observation after December 2016 due to an electronic failure.
the infrared 2 μm camera (IR2) studied the night side lower clouds' opacity to the thermal emission from the surface and deeper atmosphere (1.74–2.32 μm). It also sensed on the day side the  band at 2.02 μm, which can be used to infer the altitude of the top of the clouds. Finally, the 1.65-μm filter was used during the cruise phase to study the zodiacal light. Unavailable for observation after December 2016 due to an electronic failure.
the Ultra-Stable Oscillator (USO) for performing radio occultation experiments.

Public relations 
A public relations campaign was held between October 2009 and January 2010 by the Planetary Society and JAXA, to allow individuals to send their name and a message aboard Akatsuki. Names and messages were printed in fine letters on an aluminium plate and placed aboard Akatsuki. 260,214 people submitted names and messages for the mission. Around 90 aluminium plates were created for the spacecraft, including three aluminium plates in which the images of the Vocaloid Hatsune Miku and her super deformed-styled figure Hachune Miku were printed.

Operations

Launch

Akatsuki left the Sagamihara Campus on 17 March 2010, and arrived at the Tanegashima Space Center's Spacecraft Test and Assembly Building 2 on 19 March. On 4 May, Akatsuki was encapsulated inside the large payload fairing of the H-IIA rocket that launched the spacecraft, along with the IKAROS solar sail, on a 6-month journey to Venus. On 9 May, the payload fairing was transported to the Tanegashima Space Center's Vehicle Assembly Building, where the fairing was mated to the H-IIA launch vehicle itself.

The spacecraft was launched on 20 May 2010 at 21:58:22 (UTC) from the Tanegashima Space Center, after being delayed because of weather from its initial 18 May scheduled target.

Orbit insertion failure
Akatsuki was planned to initiate orbit insertion operations by igniting the orbital maneuvering engine at 23:49:00 on 6 December 2010 UTC.

The orbit insertion maneuver was confirmed to have started on time, but after the expected blackout due to occultation by Venus, the communication with the probe did not recover as planned. The probe was found to be in safe-hold mode, spin-stabilized state with ten minutes per rotation.  Due to the low communication speed through the low-gain antenna, it took a while to determine the state of the probe. JAXA stated on 8 December that the probe's orbital insertion maneuver had failed. At a press conference on 10 December, officials reported that Akatsukis engines fired for less than three minutes, far less than what was required to enter into Venus orbit. Further research found that the likely reason for the engine malfunction was salt deposits jamming the valve between the helium pressurization tank and the fuel tank. As a result, engine combustion became oxidizer-rich, with resulting high combustion temperatures damaging the combustion chamber throat and nozzle. A similar vapor leakage problem destroyed the NASA Mars Observer probe in 1993.

As a result, the probe was in a heliocentric orbit, rather than Venus orbit. Since the resulting orbit had an orbital period of 203 days, shorter than Venus' orbital period of 225 days, the probe drifted around the Sun compared to Venus.

Recovery efforts
JAXA developed plans to attempt another orbital insertion burn when the probe returned to Venus in December 2015. This required placing the probe into "hibernation" or safe mode to prolong its life beyond the original 4.5-year design.  JAXA expressed some confidence in keeping the probe operational, pointing to reduced battery wear, since the probe was then orbiting the Sun instead of its intended Venusian orbit.

Telemetry data from the original failure suggested that the throat of its main engine, the orbit maneuver engine (OME) was still largely intact, and trial jet thrusts of the probe's onboard OME were performed twice, on 7 and 14 September 2011. Following these tests, it was determined that insufficient specific impulse would be available for orbital maneuvering by the OME. It was concluded that the remaining combustion chamber throat was completely destroyed by transient ignition of the engine. As a result, the selected strategy was to use four hydrazine attitude control thrusters, also called reaction control system (RCS), to drive the probe into orbit around Venus. Because the RCS thrusters do not need oxidiser, the remaining  of oxidiser (MON) was vented overboard in October 2011 to reduce the mass of the spacecraft.

Three peri-Venus orbital maneuvers were executed on 1 November, 10 and 21 November 2011 using the RCS thrusters. Because the RCS thrusters' specific impulse is low compared to the specific impulse of the OME, the previously planned insertion into low Venusian orbit became impossible. Instead, the new plan was to place the probe in a highly elliptical orbit with an apoapsis of a hundred thousand kilometers and a periapsis of a few thousand kilometers from Venus. Engineers planned for the alternate orbit to be prograde (in the direction of the atmospheric super-rotation) and lie in the orbital plane of Venus. The method and orbit were announced by JAXA in February 2015, with an orbit insertion date of 7 December 2015. The probe reached its most distant point from Venus on 3 October 2013 and had been approaching the planet since then.

Orbit insertion

After performing the last of a series of four trajectory correction maneuvers between 17 July and 11 September 2015, the probe was established on a trajectory to fly past Venus on 7 December 2015, when Akatsuki would make a maneuver to enter Venus orbit after a 20-minute burn with four thrusters that were not rated for such a hefty propulsive maneuver.  Instead of taking about 30 hours to complete an orbit around Venus—as was originally planned—the new orbit targeted would place Akatsuki in a nine-day orbit after an adjustment in March 2016.

Status

The orbiter started its two-year period of "regular" science operations in mid-May 2016. Since 9 December 2016, the near-infrared 1-μm and 2-μm cameras have  been unavailable for observations due to an electronic failure. Its long-wave infrared camera, ultraviolet imager, and lightning and airglow camera continue normal operation.

By April 2018, Akatsuki finished its regular observation phase, and entered an extended operation phase. Extended operations are approved until the end of 2020, with further mission extensions to be considered based on the spacecraft's condition at that time. Akatsuki has enough fuel to continue operating for at least 2 more years as of November 2019.

As of December 2021, Akatsuki continues in operation and collecting data, without a planned end-of-mission date.

Science
Three hours after insertion in December 2015 and in "a few glimmers in April and May" 2016 the craft's instruments recorded a "bow-shape feature in the atmosphere stretching 6,000 miles, almost pole to pole — a sideways smile". The mission is collecting data in all relevant spectral bands from ultraviolet (280 nm) to mid-infrared wavelengths (10 μm).

The wind speed maximized near the equator. In September 2017, JAXA scientists named this phenomenon 'Venusian equatorial jet'. They also published results on equatorial winds at the cloud-top level by tracking clouds on the UV spectrum. A significant result in 2018 is the appearance of thick clouds of small particles near the transition between upper and middle clouds, what was described as a "new and puzzling morphology of the complex cloud cover." By 2017, the science team published 3D maps on the Venus atmosphere structure. The physical quantities retrieved include the pressure, the temperature, the  vapor density, and the ionospheric electron density and their variations. By the year 2019, the first results about the morphology, temporal changes and the winds at the middle clouds of Venus were published and merited the cover in Geophysical Research Letters, reporting unexpectedly high contrasts that might indicate the presence of absorbers like water.

To image lightning, the orbiter has sight of the dark side of Venus for about 30 minutes every 10 days. As of July 2019, it has accumulated 16.8 hours of observations of the night side, and no lightning has been detected.

Gallery

See also

 
 
 List of Venus probes

References

External links 

 Venus Climate Orbiter Akatsuki official website
 JAXA Akatsuki Planet-C page
 JAXA Akatsuki Special Site
 DARTS (ISAS JAXA) Akatsuki Science Archive
 Planet-C page (Solar Terrestrial Physics Group)
  Detailed Space Review article about Akatsuki and its recovery
 Venus Climate Orbiter Akatsuki (PDF, 1.72 Mb)
 Akatsuki - List of scientific publications
 A new look at Venus with Akatsuki by the Planetary Society

Missions to Venus
Japanese space probes
Space probes launched in 2010
JAXA
Orbiters (space probe)
Spacecraft launched by H-II rockets